The Football League Trophy 1998–99, known as the Auto Windscreens Shield 1998–99 for sponsorship reasons, was the 16th staging of the Football League Trophy, a knock-out competition for English football clubs in Second and Third Division. The winners were Wigan Athletic who beat Millwall 1–0 in the final.

The competition began on 5 December 1998 and ended with the final on 18 April 1999 at the Wembley Stadium.

In the first round, there were two sections: North and South. In the following rounds each section gradually eliminates teams in knock-out fashion until each has a winning finalist. At this point, the two winning finalists face each other in the combined final to determine the winners of the Football League Trophy.

First round
Carlisle United, Chesterfield, Halifax Town, Lincoln City, Rochdale, Scarborough, Scunthorpe United and York City from the North section all received byes.

Brighton & Hove Albion, Cambridge United, Exeter City, Fulham, Luton Town, Northampton Town, Southend United and Torquay United from the South section all received byes.

Northern Section

Southern Section

Second round

Northern Section

Southern Section

Quarter-finals

Northern Section

Southern Section

Area semi-finals

Northern Section

Southern Section

Area finals

Northern Area final

Wigan Athletic beat Wrexham 5–2 on aggregate.

Southern Area final

Millwall beat Walsall 2–1 on aggregate.

Final

External links
Official website
Auto Windscreens Shield – 1998/99
 

EFL Trophy
Tro
1998–99 domestic association football cups